Thackeray, Saskatchewan is an unincorporated community, school site, and elevator site on the Canadian Pacific line running northwest of Wilkie, Saskatchewan.

The former elevator site north of the school site is now a bulk liquid blending and distribution site for Rack Petroleum.

References 

Buffalo No. 409, Saskatchewan
Unincorporated communities in Saskatchewan
Division No. 13, Saskatchewan